The Incitement to Mutiny Act 1797 (37 Geo 3 c 70) was an Act passed by the Parliament of Great Britain. The Act was passed in the aftermath of the Spithead and Nore mutinies and aimed to prevent the seduction of sailors and soldiers to commit mutiny.

The Act was made permanent by the Allegiance of Sea and Land  Forces Act 1817 (57 Geo 3 c 7).

The Parliament of Ireland passed an equivalent Act in the same year: the Incitement to Disaffection Act (Ireland) 1797 37 Geo 3 c 40 (I).

Section 1 - Any person who shall attempt to seduce any sailor or soldier from his duty or incite him to mutiny, etc to suffer death
This section provided:

The words at the end were repealed by the Statute Law Revision Act 1888.

The reference to felony had to be construed according to the Criminal Law Act 1967 and the Criminal Law Act (Northern Ireland) 1967.

The offence was extended to members of the Royal Air Force by the Air Force (Application of Enactments) (No 2) Order 1918 (S.R. & O. 1918/548).

The death penalty for the offence under section 1 was reduced to transportation for life by section 1 of the Punishment of Offences Act 1837. It was reduced again to penal servitude for life by section 2 of the Penal Servitude Act 1857, and to imprisonment for life by section 1(1) of the Criminal Justice Act 1948 and of the Criminal Justice (Scotland) Act 1949.

Section 2
This section was repealed by Part III of Schedule 3 to the Criminal Law Act 1967.

Section 3 - Persons tried for offences against this Act not to be tried again for the same, as high treason, or misprision of high treason, etc
This section read:

Section 4
This section was repealed by the Statute Law Revision Act 1871.

See also
 Mutiny Acts
 Incitement to Disaffection Act 1934

Notes

External links
The Incitement to Mutiny Act 1797, at the time of its repeal.

Great Britain Acts of Parliament 1797